The 2022 Clásica de Almería was the 37th edition of the Clásica de Almería one-day road cycling race. It was held on 13 February 2022 as a category 1.Pro race on the 2022 UCI ProSeries.

The  race took place in the Spanish province of Almería, from El Ejido to Roquetas de Mar. The first half of the race course featured several climbs, the most prominent of which was the second-category Alto de Celín, which crested less than  into the race.

The race's main breakaway consisted of three riders: Xabier Azparren, Gilles De Wilde, and Lukas Pöstlberger. The trio claimed almost all of the intermediate sprint and mountains classifications points on offer throughout the route, with Azparren winning the mountains classification and Pöstlberger winning the intermediate sprint classification. With over  left, De Wilde was the first to be dropped from the lead group, while the remaining duo were caught by the peloton with under  left. There were several crashes in the final few kilometres, but in the final sprint, Alexander Kristoff won by a narrow margin ahead of Nacer Bouhanni and defending champion Giacomo Nizzolo.

Teams 
Eight of the 18 UCI WorldTeams and 11 UCI ProTeams made up the 19 teams that participated in the race. 12 teams entered a full squad of seven riders each. Four teams (and ) entered a squad of six riders each, and two teams ( and ) entered a squad of five riders each, while  was only able to enter a squad of four riders. In total, 122 riders started the race, of which 112 finished.

UCI WorldTeams

 
 
 
 
 
 
 
 

UCI ProTeams

Result

References

Sources

External links 
 

2022
Clásica de Almería
Clásica de Almería
Clásica de Almería
2020s in Andalusia